New Abirem is a small town in south Ghana and the capital of the Birim North District, a district in the Eastern Region of south Ghana.
A curiosity is that this remote town hosts a modern resort called Beige Village Golf Resort and Spa, where locals, tourists and especially expats can be entertained by various activities such as golf and spa treats. The resort is well known in the country for organising Junior Golf competitions.

The mining giant, Newmont Golden Ridge Ltd has its Akyem mines in the District. It has been operating in the District since 2011. The operations of the mine is largely credited for the rapid expansion and development of the District, especially the capital.

References

Populated places in the Eastern Region (Ghana)